Jalan Pulau Tawar-Durian Hijau (Pahang state route C143) is a major road in Pahang, Malaysia.

List of junctions

Roads in Pahang